Hot Action Cop is the debut album by American rock band Hot Action Cop. It was released on March 4, 2003. The album was also released in a clean (censored) version and featured a whole new set of lyrics for the song "Show Her" (excluding the chorus) including a bridge that made fun of the need to censor an album.

Track listing

Popular culture
The tracks "Goin' Down on It" and "Fever for the Flava" was featured in the 2002 racing video game Need for Speed: Hot Pursuit 2. "Fever for the Flava" was also featured in the films American Wedding and Grind.

Personnel
Hot Action Cop
Luis Espaillat – Bass
Kory Knipp – Drums
Tim Flaherty – Guitar 
Rob Werthner – Vocals, and Guitar

Additional musician
Murray "Eh" Atkinson - Guitar
Roach - Keyboards

Production
Michael Baker (tracks: 4, 5, 7, 10, 11), Paul Silveira (tracks: 4, 5, 7, 10, 11), Randy Staub (tracks: 1 to 3, 6, 8, 9), Robert "Void" Caprio (tracks: 12) – mixing
Charlie Brocco, Max Maxwell, Paul Silveira, Shaun Thingvold – engineering (Additional)
Amy Worobec, Arthur Kirkby, Chad Taylor, Kathy Miller, Kristina Ardron, Mike Weinstein, Misha Rajaratnam – engineering (Assistant)
Alex Aligizakis, Carla Levis, Dave "The Scribe" Bryant*, Kirk McNally – engineering (Second)
Robert "Void" Caprio - Recording
Charlie Becker – Artwork
George Marino – Mastering

References

2003 debut albums
Hot Action Cop albums